Charles Brun (16 February 1866 in Copenhagen – 28 January 1919) was a Danish politician, representing the Venstre Reform Party in Parliament (Folketinget). He served as Finance Minister of Denmark in the Cabinet of Niels Neergaard I from October 12, 1908 to August 16, 1909.

References 

1866 births
1919 deaths
Danish Finance Ministers
Members of the Folketing
Politicians from Copenhagen
Brun family